Birmingham Airport , formerly Birmingham International Airport, is an international airport located  east-southeast of Birmingham city centre,  west-northwest of Coventry slightly north of Bickenhill village, in the Metropolitan Borough of Solihull, England.

Officially opened as Elmdon Airport on 8 July 1939, the airport was requisitioned by the Air Ministry during the Second World War and used by both the Royal Air Force (RAF) and the Royal Navy as RAF Elmdon. It was largely used for flight training and wartime production purposes. On 8 July 1946, the aerodrome was reopened to civilian operations.

Birmingham Airport currently holds a CAA Public Use Aerodrome Licence (Number P451) that allows flights for the public transport of passengers or for flying instruction. Passenger throughput in 2017 was over 12.9 million, making Birmingham the seventh busiest airport in the UK. The airport offers international flights to destinations in Europe, the Middle East, the Indian subcontinent, North America, and the Caribbean. Birmingham Airport is an operating base for Jet2.com, Ryanair and TUI Airways.

Location
It is bordered by the National Exhibition Centre to the east, Marston Green to the north, Sheldon to the west, the village of Bickenhill to the south, and the village of Elmdon to the south west.

It is primarily served by the A45 main road, and is near Junction 6 of the M42 motorway. It is connected by the elevated AirRail Link with Birmingham International railway station on the West Coast Main Line.

The airport's location southeast of the city, plus the only operational runway being northwest–southeast (15/33), means that depending on wind direction, aircraft land or take-off directly over Birmingham. The former northeast–southwest runway (06/24) has been incorporated into a taxiway for aircraft accessing runway 15/33.

History

Construction and opening
In 1928, Birmingham City Council decided that the city required a municipal airport; thus soon thereafter a committee was established to work towards establishing such a facility. By 1931, several locations, including Shirley, Elmdon and Aldridge, were reportedly under consideration as potential sites. While Elmdon was considered to be an impressive and appropriate site for the airport, further progress was delayed due to spending cutbacks that had been initiated as a consequence of the Great Depression. By 1933, the project was revived and a new airport committee was formed during the following year to oversee the airport's establishment. Prior to any major construction decisions being taken, members of the committee visited various successful airports around Europe in 1935, including Amsterdam, Berlin, Lyon, Paris, Brussels and London.

During January 1935, the airport committee approached British architectural and engineering practice Norman and Dawbarn, inviting their attendance and seeking their participation as expert advisers on the airport's construction, the practice was subsequently appointed as the project's architects. In 1933, Birmingham City Council authorised the compulsory purchase of 300 acres of land for the use by the airport; another 214 acres were similarly acquired during the following year. During 1936, a private bill presented by the Birmingham Corporation was passed through Parliament, which authorised the acquisition of further land as well as the diversion of various roads and footpaths to permit the airport's development. Shortly following the bill's passing, various agencies, including the City Engineer and Surveyor, the Public Works Department and a firm of aeronautical consultants, including Norman and Dawbarn, commenced work on preparing the ground, designing both the terminal and hangar buildings, and planning out the airport's detailed layout.

By January 1937, Norman and Dawbarn had been authorised to finalise the design drawings; these were apparently completed by June 1937. In October of that year, various contractors were appointed to construct various elements of the airport's buildings, including its elaborate terminal. Reportedly, the project's total expenditure amounted to around £360,000. Construction work proceeded at a rapid pace; on 1 May 1939, the airport had been completed to such a degree that it was ready to handle traffic.

On 8 July 1939, the Duchess of Kent, Princess Marina of Greece and Denmark, accompanied by the Prime Minister, Neville Chamberlain, officiated at the opening of Elmdon Airport. Its terminal, which incorporated the airport's air traffic control tower, was designed by Norman and Dawbarn in an Art Deco style; this facility would continue to be used as a terminal until 1984 and subsequently as staff offices and for private flights; it is still intact as of 2018. The airport was owned and operated by Birmingham City Council. Initial services flew to Croydon, Glasgow, Liverpool, Ryde, Shoreham, Manchester, and Southampton; further services were added soon thereafter, although its use as a civilian airport would soon be interrupted by the outbreak of the Second World War.

Second World War
During the Second World War, Elmdon Airport was requisitioned by the Air Ministry and was used by both the Royal Air Force (RAF) and the Royal Navy as RAF Elmdon. It was largely operated as an Elementary Flying School and a base for the Fleet Air Arm. Large numbers of Avro Lancaster and Stirling bombers were manufactured at the Austin Aero Company's shadow factory at Cofton Hackett, but were unable to take off from the short runways at Longbridge; thus, they were transported by road to RAF Elmdon, their wings being removed beforehand and re-attached after arrival. They were test flown from the aerodrome and, once declared airworthy, they were flown to their operational units. On 8 July 1946, the aerodrome was reopened to civilian operations, though it remained under government control.

1950 to 1980
During the post-war years, a number of public events, such as air fairs and air races, were held on the site. In 1949, scheduled services began with British European Airways (BEA) launching routes to Paris; the number of flights to the continent steadily grew over the years, including services to Zurich, Düsseldorf, Palma, Amsterdam and Barcelona commencing between 1955 and 1960. During 1960, the City of Birmingham resumed responsibility for the airport's operation again, ending central government control.

In 1961, an additional terminal building to handle the growing international traffic was opened, which was fittingly called The International Building. Furthermore, work to extend the airport's main runway to 7,400 feet (1.4 miles) was undertaken between 1967 and 1970, which permitted the launch of new services using turboprop and jet-powered airliners. Accordingly, a new service to New York using VC-10 airliner was launched during 1967. By the early 1970s, Birmingham Airport was reportedly handling around one million passengers per year, albeit through a relatively congested passenger terminal. In 1974, the newly formed West Midlands Metropolitan County Council took over management of the airport.

On 16 September 1980, the supersonic airliner Concorde made its first visit to Birmingham Airport. On 20 October 2003, Concorde made its final visit to the airport as part of its farewell tour.

1981 to 2000
Birmingham Airport was once home to the world's first commercial maglev system in the form of a low-speed maglev shuttle that ran along a 620-metre line between the terminal and the nearby Birmingham International railway station. Following a year of testing and trial use, the Birmingham Airport Maglev was opened to great fanfare during April 1984. However, during 1995, the Maglev rail link was discontinued after 11 years; the closure has been attributed to the system's unreliability, it having suffered from frequent breakdowns. The original guideway lay dormant but intact for a time, while proposals for its restoration or adaption for other uses were considered. In 2003, a replacement cable-hauled system, the AirRail Link Cable Liner people mover, was opened, which reused the track and much of the existing infrastructure.

During 1993, the government limited public sector borrowing came into force and was applied to Birmingham Airport. This change meant that the airport could only expand by using private sector finance. 51% of the local council shares were sold to restructure the airport into a private sector company; this initiative led to the commencement of a £260 million restructuring programme in 1997.

2000s

During November 2007, Birmingham Airport published a master plan for its development up to 2030, called "Towards 2030: Planning a Sustainable Future for Air Transport in the Midlands". This set out details of changes to the terminals, airfield layout and off-site infrastructure. As with all large scale plans, the proposals were controversial, with opposition from environmentalists and local residents. In particular, the requirement for a second parallel runway based on projected demand was disputed by opponents. Plans for a second runway (a third when demand requires) on the other side of the M42 and a new terminal complex and business park have been published, and they could help to create around 250,000 jobs. It has been estimated that if these plans went ahead, the airport could handle around 70,000,000 passengers annually, and around 500,000 aircraft movements.

In January 2008, the shorter runway (06/24) was decommissioned. It had been used less often due to its short length, noise impact, and its inconvenient position crossing the main runway, making it uneconomic to continue operation. The closure also allowed for apron expansion on both sides of the main runway. However, runway 06/24 remains open as a taxiway and a helicopter airstrip. In the same month, plans for the extension of the airport runway and the construction of a new air traffic control tower were submitted to Solihull Metropolitan Borough Council.

In June 2008, work began on building the new three-storey International Pier; it was officially opened on 9 September 2009. As part of the airport's 70th anniversary, the airport welcomed the Airbus A380 as the first user of the pier. The special service was the first commercial A380 flight in the UK outside London Heathrow Airport. The new pier is 240 metres long and 24 metres wide. Departing passengers are accommodated on the top level, with arriving passengers on the middle level and office accommodation for airline and handling agents on the ground floor. The new facility provides air-bridged aircraft parking for seven wide-bodied aircraft and enough space for 13 smaller aircraft. It can accommodate 'next generation' environmentally-efficient wide-bodied aircraft such as the Airbus A340-600, the Airbus A380, the Boeing 747-8, and the Boeing 777X. The new pier also has a new lounge for business class Emirates passengers. In March 2009, the runway extension plans were approved.

2010s

In September 2010, it was announced that after the merging of Terminals 1 and 2 into a single facility in 2011, the airport would drop the "International" from its official name to become "Birmingham Airport'". A Midlands-based marketing agency was recruited to "create a new corporate identity that reflects Birmingham Airport's current position in the market place, as well as its future potential". Figures from Birmingham Airport show that 8 million people live within a one hour's drive of the airport, but less than 40% of them use it. It is hoped that the rebrand will make the airport "more visible to the market". In November 2010, the new name started to be used. The new logo, interlocking circles in shades of blue, and slogan, "Hello World", were designed to reflect the airport's new positioning as a global travel hub.

In January 2011 the viewing gallery, 'Aviation Experience And Gift Shop', closed indefinitely. In the same month, the airport merged its two terminals into a single terminal building, which involved the construction of two additional floors. A new lower ground floor accommodates the new Arrivals and Meet & Greet area, while the 3rd floor was built in the Millennium Link and the two terminals to accommodate the new Centralised Security Search area. In July 2011, construction of a new control tower began. The new control tower was completed in March 2012; it replaced the airport's original tower, which had been used since the airport opened in 1939.

On 23 February 2011, Birmingham Airport announced that the High Speed 2 railway could be a solution to runway capacity problems in London; management figures suggested that it would be quicker to get to London from Birmingham than from Stansted Airport once completed, and claimed that the airport had capacity for nine million more passengers.

Plans for the extension of the airport's runway, and the construction of the new air traffic control tower, were submitted to Solihull Metropolitan Borough Council in January 2008, and approved in March 2009. Originally, the target for completion was in time for the 2012 London Olympics and Paralympics. An Olympic ceremony was held at the airport on 23 April 2012. The Olympic rings were unveiled on the tower and could be seen from the A45 road and the main terminal building. This was to commemorate the build-up to the London 2012 Olympic Games. These rings were removed once the Olympic Games officially closed, just before the 2012 Summer Paralympics began. Work on the new runway eventually began in autumn 2012. The extension to the southern end of the runway originally required the A45 Coventry Road to be diverted into a tunnel under the extended section, but to cut costs, it was diverted south of the runway instead. In Summer 2013 the new air traffic control tower became fully operational; the old carriageway of the A45 was closed and the new carriageway was opened. In May 2014, the 400-metre runway extension was officially opened; the full length was first used on 22 July 2014, when China Southern Airlines operated its first charter between Birmingham and Beijing.

The Ontario Teachers' Pension Plan, a Canadian institutional investor, increased its stake in the airport to 48.25% in early 2015. It also owns 100% of Bristol Airport. Birmingham handled over 11.6 million passengers in 2016, a record total for the airport, making it the seventh busiest UK airport.

On 28 September 2016, £100 million of investment was allocated to a new baggage handling system and two new car parks, including a drop-off car park.

Since 2020

British regional airline Flybe operated an extensive route network from Birmingham to destinations within the United Kingdom and mainland Europe until it entered administration on 4 March 2020, and has since resumed operations using the airport as its headquarters and main base of operations. In 2020, during the COVID-19 pandemic, a temporary mortuary was established in a hangar at the airport, with space for 12,000 bodies.

On 13 January 2023, Emirates announced that they will return to flying the iconic Airbus A380 on their daily flights to Birmingham Airport from 1 July 2023. Previously, Emirates had used the Airbus A380 on their flights to Birmingham since 2016, however they resumed using the Boeing 777 during the COVID-19 pandemic due to less demand.

In January 2023, regional airline Flybe, successor to the aforementioned airline of the same name, which maintained its main base in Birmingham, entered administration and ceased all operations.

Facilities and infrastructure
Birmingham Airport's current terminal complex combines the two old terminals via the Millennium Link in to one large terminal, with gates 1–20 in the old Terminal 2, and all other gates in the old Terminal 1.

Terminal 1 was opened on 3 April 1984, seventeen years after the original plans to construct a new terminal to ease congestion in the original Elmdon Terminal (Grade II listed since August 2018 and used for private and official flights). Since then, T1 has been extended multiple times to accommodate the increase in both passenger numbers and aircraft movements.

All check in desks and arrivals are on the ground floor. The central security area, along with airside shops and restaurants are located on the first floor.

Airlines and destinations

Passenger

The following airlines operate regular scheduled and charter services to and from Birmingham:

Cargo

Statistics

Passenger figures

Busiest routes

Accidents and incidents
 
 
 
  Follow this link for a more detailed report and Official reports from the AAIB.
  Follow this link for a more detailed report and Official reports from the AAIB.
 16 June 2018: A Norwegian Air International Boeing 737-800 was travelling from Keflavik Airport to Madrid Airport when a hydraulic failure was reported. A hydraulic leak was seen from the left gear so the crew decided to divert the aircraft to Birmingham Airport. Tyre debris was seen exploding around during the landing along with small flames. The aircraft stopped on the runway and everyone on board was safely taken off. Flights from Birmingham Airport were cancelled for 4 hours due to this incident.

Security incidents

Ground transport

Public transport

Rail
Birmingham Airport is served by Birmingham International railway station. The station is on the West Coast Main Line between Birmingham and London, and trains are operated by West Midlands Trains, Avanti West Coast, Transport For Wales, and CrossCountry. Access between the railway station and the airport terminal is provided by free AirRail Link.

Proposed High Speed 2
As part of Phase 1 of the High Speed 2 rail link, a new railway station called Birmingham Interchange will be built to serve both the airport and the National Exhibition Centre. The station will be built on the far side of the M42 motorway and connect to the airport using a "rapid transit people mover". High Speed 2 is currently planned for completion by 2029.

West Midlands Metro
There are plans to implement a new Line 3 of the West Midlands Metro to Birmingham Airport from Edgbaston, this would link Birmingham Interchange, Birmingham International and Birmingham Airport to the City Centre of Birmingham in 30 minutes travelling along the A45.

Bus and coach
National Express West Midlands operates the main bus routes calling at Birmingham Airport, those being the X1 to Birmingham city centre and Coventry, and the X12 to Chelmsley Wood and Solihull. Other smaller operators also call at the airport. Bus stops are situated outside Terminal One. Most buses are operated by National Express West Midlands.

National Express Coaches operates various long-distance coaches calling at Birmingham Airport on the way to or from Birmingham coach station.

Taxi
Black cabs are available at the taxi-rank outside the arrivals area of the terminal.

Car
Birmingham Airport is accessible from the north and south via Junction Six of the M42 motorway. From Birmingham city centre, the A45 runs directly to the airport. Parking charges apply in some areas even for very short periods of time, with locations farther from the airport being cheaper than those near the airport.

Bicycle
The only cycle route available heads south over the A45 travelling towards Solihull. Birmingham Airport has however published "recommended routes" for cyclists. Free short term cycle parking is available close to the terminal. For longer stays, bicycles must be stored in the Left Luggage for a charge.

See also
 Transport in Birmingham

References

External links

 Official website
 Airport Consultative Committee
 Birmingham Airport Maglev 1984 - 1995
 
 Opening ceremony, 1939  Pathé Newsreel

Buildings and structures in Solihull
Buildings and structures in Birmingham, West Midlands
Companies based in Birmingham, West Midlands
Transport in Birmingham, West Midlands
Airports established in 1939
1939 establishments in England
Airports in the West Midlands (region)